The 1894–95 season in Scottish football was the 22nd season of competitive football in Scotland and the fifth season of the Scottish Football League.

League competitions

Scottish Division One 

Hearts won the Scottish Division One.

Scottish Division Two 

Hibernian topped the Scottish Division Two for the second successive year. Renton failed to show for their fixture at Dundee Wanderers, hence only 17 games played for both clubs. Dundee Wanderers were awarded the two points for the game.

Other honours

Cup honours

National

County

Non-league honours

Senior 
Highland League

Other Leagues

Scotland national team

Key:
(H) = Home match
(A) = Away match
BHC = British Home Championship

Other national teams

Scottish League XI

See also
1894–95 Rangers F.C. season

Notes

References

 
Seasons in Scottish football